The Kings Arms, Leaves Green is a pub in Leaves Green Road, Leaves Green, Keston, Bromley, London.

It is a Grade II listed building, dating back to the 18th century.

References

External links
 

Grade II listed pubs in London
Pubs in the London Borough of Bromley
Grade II listed buildings in the London Borough of Bromley